A counting-out game or counting-out rhyme is a simple method of 'randomly' selecting a person from a group, often used by children for the purpose of playing another game. It usually requires no materials, and is achieved with spoken words or hand gestures. The historian Henry Carrington Bolton suggested in his 1888 book Counting Out Rhymes of Children that the custom of counting out originated in the "superstitious practices of divination by lots."

Many such methods involve one person pointing at each participant in a circle of players while reciting a rhyme. A new person is pointed at as each word is said. The player who is selected at the conclusion of the rhyme is "it" or "out".  In an alternate version, the circle of players may each put two feet in and at the conclusion of the rhyme, that player removes one foot and the rhyme starts over with the next person. In this case, the first player that has both feet removed is "it" or "out".  In theory a counting rhyme is determined entirely by the starting selection (and would result in a modulo operation), but in practice they are often accepted as random selections because the number of words has not been calculated beforehand, so the result is unknown until someone is selected.

A variant of counting-out game, known as the Josephus problem, represents a famous theoretical problem in mathematics and computer science.

Examples
Several simple games can be played to select one person from a group, either as a straightforward winner, or as someone who is eliminated. Rock, Paper, Scissors, Odd or Even and Blue Shoe require no materials and are played using hand gestures, although with the former it is possible for a player to win or lose through skill rather than luck. Coin flipping and drawing straws are fair methods of randomly determining a player. Fizz Buzz is a spoken word game where if a player slips up and speaks a word out of sequence, they are eliminated.

Common rhymes

(These rhymes may have many local or regional variants.)
 Eeny, meeny, miny, moe
 10 Little Indians
 Five Little Ducks
 Ip dip
 One, Two, Three, Four, Five
 Tinker, Tailor (traditionally played in England)
 Yan Tan Tethera
 Inky Pinky Ponky
 One potato, two potato
Ink-a-dink
 Akka bakka bonka rakka
 En Den Dino

Cultural references

Marx Brothers 
A scene in the Marx Brothers movie Duck Soup plays on the fact that counting-out games are not really random.  Faced with selecting someone to go on a dangerous mission, the character Chicolini (Chico Marx) chants:

Rrringspot, vonza, twoza, zig-zag-zav, popti, vinaga, [tin-lie, tav,] harem, scarem, merchan, tarem, teir, tore...

only to stop as he realizes he is about to select himself.  He then says, "I did it wrong.  Wait, wait, I start here", and repeats the chant—with the same result. After that, he says, "That's no good too.  I got it!" and reduces the chant to

Rrringspot, buck!

And with this version he finally manages to "randomly" select someone else.

Seinfeld 
A version of a counting game "ink-a-dink" features in the Seinfeld episode "The Statue." The relevant scene includes a discussion between the characters of Jerry and George if the person who is "it" is the "winner" or the "loser": JERRY: Alright, let's go. Hey, you know, you owe me one.

GEORGE: What?

JERRY: The Ink-a-dink.. you were "It".

GEORGE: "It"'s bad?

JERRY: "It"'s very bad.

See also
 Repetitive song

References

External links

Videos of "choosing songs" a.k.a. Counting rhymes
Selection Rhymes at the BBC's project h2g2
 Counting rhymes and other songs for counting in traditional music from county of Nice, France.

 
Nursery rhymes